The 1760s (pronounced "seventeen-sixties") was a decade of the Gregorian calendar that began on January 1, 1760, and ended on December 31, 1769.

Marked by great upheavals on culture, technology, and diplomacy, the 1760s was a transitional decade that effectively brought on the modern era from Baroqueism. The Seven Years' War – arguably the most widespread conflict of its time – carried trends of imperialism outside of European reaches, where it would head on to countless territories (mainly in Asia and Africa) for decades to come under colonialism.

References